Rokiškis is a city in northeastern Lithuania with a population of about 14,400.

History

The legend of the founding of Rokiškis tells about a hunter called Rokas who had been hunting for hares (Lit. "kiškis"). However, cities ending in "-kiškis" are quite popular in the region. The city was first mentioned in 1499. At first, it was Prince Kroszinski's residence, later count Tyzenhaus build a neogothic church of St. Matthias and Rokiškis Manor, which is well preserved today and houses the Rokiškis Regional Museum. The town was planned in a classicist manner.

Rokiškis was part of the Grand Duchy of Lithuania and the Commonwealth of Poland-Lithuania (Rzeczpospolita) until 1795 when Lithuania was annexed by the Russian Empire. Rokiškis was included in the Vilna Governorate, until 1843 when the Novo-Alexandrovsk district (uyezd) was transferred to the newly established Kovno Governorate.

The city started to grow in 1873 when a branch of the Libau–Romny Railway was built which connected Dünaburg/Daugavpils to the east with the ice-free Baltic port of Libau/Liepāja.

In the summer of 1915, the German army occupied the city.  When the war ended, the area became part of the new Republic of Lithuania. Rokiškis was granted city rights in 1920.  Because of strained relationships between Lithuania and the nearby newly created Republics of Poland and Latvia, Rokiškis was economically isolated during the inter-war period.

Coat of arms

The first arms for the city were designed in 1970 but were abolished the same year. The current coat of arms was approved in 1993. The shield is divided into 4 quarters. 3 of the quarters depict 3 families that ruled the city: the candelabrum represents the Kroszinski family; the bull is a symbol of the Tyzenhaus family, and three bars and a fleur-de-lis are taken from the arms of the Przezdziecki family. The fourth quarter shows the organ that is housed at the Church of St. Matthias and reflects city's musical heritage (see Rokiškis Music School).

Industry

Situated on the Daugavpils-Liepaja railroad, during the 19th century Rokiškis served as a commercial center for a large rural area and a point for the export of wood, grain, and flax. 
Rokiškis is well known for its cheese. "Rokiškio sūris" is one of the largest cheese manufacturing companies in Lithuania. It grew from a small local dairy established in 1925. In 1964  Soviets built a specialized factory. At present after reconstructions and foreign capital investments, its sales reach 400 million litas (about 155 million USD). 60% of the production is sold in foreign markets. The company is a very important employer in the region. It is also an important supporter of community initiatives.

Jewish history
There was a vibrant Jewish community in Rokiškis for hundreds of years. The first Jewish settlement may have been prior to 1574 and was located at the present site of the old Jewish cemetery (about half a kilometer southwest from the market square) until the mid-1700s, when the community moved to the area near the market square and Kamai Street (now Respublikos gatvė). In 1847 there were 593 Jews in the town and in 1897 2,067 (75% of the total population). The community had a strong Hasidic movement with Lubavitch, Babroiser, and Ladier shuls. By the early 20th century, however, the haskalah (Jewish Enlightenment) had had an impact and a Jewish school with secular subjects had started, some Jewish students attended the gymnasia in  Rokiškis and Dvinsk, and in 1910 a Russian gymnasium for Jewish students was established. There was also a significant revolutionary movement in the community.    

In May 1915, during World War I, Jews in central Lithuania were forcibly deported to the east by order of the Czarist government. Although Jews in the Rokiškis area were not the subject of the deportation order, as the Russian forces retreated Cossacks serving in a rearguard capacity terrorized the Jews in northeastern Lithuania and most of the Jews in the Rokiškis fled to the interior of Russia. One of those who left was Yakov (Yankel) Smushkevich who later became the commander of the Soviet Air Forces before being purged and executed in 1941. The Germans occupied Rokiškis until 1918.

When World War I ended and the Republic of Lithuania was established, Lithuanian Jews were permitted to return home. The Jewish community of Rokiškis numbered 2,013 in 1923. Initially the community thrived, shuls reopened and in addition  there were strong, competing socialist and Zionist movements. Rokiškis developed rapidly after World War I but under different economic conditions. Before the war, for example, Rokiškis could trade with nearby Dvinsk/Daugavpils/Dunaburg, Latvia, to which it was connected by a rail line. During the 1920s, however, Lithuania's border with Latvia was closed. As a result, trade increased with towns to the west which were connected by rail lines, such as Panevėžys/Ponevizh, Šiauliai/Shavli, and Kaunas/Kovno.  (There was also a small gauge rail line to Pandėlys/Ponidel.) Prior to World War I, only 3 stores had been Christian-owned. After the war, however, many Lithuanians from surrounding villages came to settle in Rokiškis and open stores. Ori Further, Lithuanian cooperatives came into being, trade in flax and produce was nationalized, and other factors caused a severe economic decline for the Jews. Many Jewish businesses went bankrupt in 1925 and between 1926 and 1930 many Jewish families emigrated to South Africa where a landmanschaft was established in Johannesburg, the United States of America, and Palestine. In 1939 there were 3,500 Jews in Rokiškis (40% of the total population). They were mostly Chabad Chasidim. During the period of Lithuanian independence (1918–1940) there were two Hebrew schools.

The Soviets annexed Lithuania in 1940 and all Jewish businesses were confiscated.  When Nazi Germany attacked the Soviet Union on June 21–22, 1941, Lithuania was quickly overrun. The Germans soon brought in special assignment squads to arrest and murder Jews. The Jews of Rokiškis and its environs were murdered in nearby woods just north of Bajorai, 400 meters east of the intersection of the northeasterly road to Juodupė and the northerly road to Lukštai. The official German army report (“the Jager Report”) states that on August 15–16, 1941, a total of 3,207 Jews were killed. Other Jews were deported to the ghetto of Joniškis and killed there.

People of note 
Rokiškis is the birthplace of the commander of the Soviet Air Force and Hero of the USSR, Yakov Smushkevich. It is also the birthplace of archaeologist Laima Vaitkunskienė.

Twin towns — sister cities

Rokiškis is a member of the Douzelage, a town twinning association of towns across the European Union. As of 2019, its members are:

 Agros, Cyprus
 Altea, Spain
 Asikkala, Finland
 Bad Kötzting, Germany
 Bellagio, Italy
 Bundoran, Ireland
 Chojna, Poland
 Granville, France
 Holstebro, Denmark
 Houffalize, Belgium
 Judenburg, Austria
 Kőszeg, Hungary
 Marsaskala, Malta
 Meerssen, Netherlands
 Niederanven, Luxembourg
 Oxelösund, Sweden
 Preveza, Greece
 Rovinj, Croatia
 Sesimbra, Portugal
 Sherborne, England, United Kingdom
 Sigulda, Latvia
 Siret, Romania
 Škofja Loka, Slovenia
 Sušice, Czech Republic
 Tryavna, Bulgaria
 Türi, Estonia
 Zvolen, Slovakia

Other twin towns

 Borșa, Romania
 Cēsis, Latvia
 Daugavpils Municipality, Latvia
 Estenfeld, Germany
 Harbin, China
 Jēkabpils, Latvia
 Ludza, Latvia
 Ozurgeti, Georgia
 Pabianice, Poland
 Provadia, Bulgaria
 Tamsalu, Estonia
 Viesīte, Latvia

References

External links

 The murder of the Jews of Rokiškis during World War II, at Yad Vashem website.
 More information on the Jewish history in Rokiskis.

 
Cities in Lithuania
Cities in Panevėžys County
Municipalities administrative centres of Lithuania
Novoalexandrovsky Uyezd
Holocaust locations in Lithuania
Rokiškis District Municipality